The Chinese Communist Party (CCP) was founded in China in 1921, growing quickly to eventually establish the People's Republic of China under the rule of Chairman Mao Zedong in 1949. As a Marxist–Leninist party, the Chinese Communist Party is theoretically committed to female equality, and has vowed to placed women's liberation on their agenda.  Since 1949, women rights and gender equality had greatly improved in communist China under Mao Zedong's rule.

Early 1900s 

In the 1910s and 1920s, the May Fourth Movement advocated for more equality between women and men, more educational opportunities for women, and female emancipation. This era was more open and accommodating to feminism than the eras that followed it. The majority of activists and reformers during this period were males who desired to change China's overall society structure and make the nation stronger. Regardless, the May Fourth Movement was the first feminist movement to openly challenge the gender divides in Chinese society. The movement, however, only affected a small number of elite women who lived in urban areas. The majority of women that lived in more the rural countryside seemed to be minimally impacted.

During this time, organized marriages were often arranged by the parents of the bride. The only way that women could initiate a divorce was by suicide, whereas men could divorce for numerous of their own reasons.

By the 1920s, the Communist movement in China used a labor and peasant organizing strategy that combined workplace advocacy with women's rights advocacy. The Communists would lead union organizing efforts among male workers while simultaneously working in nearby peasant communities on women's rights issues, including literacy for women. Mao Zedong and Yang Kaihui were among the most effective Communist political organizers using this method.

During the Chinese Civil War, the Communists enacted women's rights measures in areas of the country they controlled. Orders issued by the Red Army's soviet governments advanced the freedom to divorce and marry, liberating women from feudal marriages and resulting in women's strong support for the revolution. In the revolutionary base area of Jiangxi, the Communist-led authorities enacted the Marriage Regulations of 1931 and the Marriage Laws of 1941, which were modeled after Soviet Union statutes. These statutes declared marriage as a free association between a woman and a man without the interference of other parties and permitted divorce on mutual agreement. At the time, they were the most progressive marriage laws in China and created the conditions for women to divorce men they had been forced to marry, leave abusive spouses, and till their own land.

Land reform movement 
During China's land reform movement (which began after the defeat of the Japanese in the Second Sino-Japanese War and continued in the early years of the People's Republic of China), the Communist Party encouraged rural women in achieving a "double fanshen" - a revolutionary transformation as both a peasant and a feminist awakening as a woman. The Party urged rural women to reject traditional Chinese assumptions about their role in society. In conjunction with land reform, the movement promoted women's issues such as the elimination of bride prices and reversing the stigma against widows remarrying. The Party promoted successes in women's liberation, such as the progress of the Hui women of northwest China who were said to have not just received land through the rural movement, but also "freedom over their own bodies" and embraced political participation. The Party also publicized reports of individual women activists, such as Guo Suzhen, a Liaoning woman who was first mobilized during a 1947 mass mobilization campaign.

Mao era (1949–1976) 
After the Chinese Communist Revolution in 1949, dramatic changes began to be put in place to guarantee equality between men and women. Professor Lin Chun writes, "Women's liberation had been highlighted in the communist agenda from the outset and, in that sense, the Chinese revolution was simultaneously a women's revolution, and Chinese socialism a women's cause." After the founding of the PRC in 1949, newly-established local governments continued to prioritize women's political mobilization. The famous quote from Mao Zedong, reported to have been uttered in 1968, reflects the commitment of the new government of the People's Republic of China: "Women hold up half the sky".

Legislation 
In 1950, the Chinese Communist Party adopted two pieces of legislative law to help bring about gender equality. First, the Marriage Law outlawed prostitution, arranged marriage, child betrothal, and concubinage. Free marriage and divorce were heavily advocated by the government, along with economic independence for women. Second, the Land Law attempted to mobilize women to participate in the labor force by relocating them from rural to urban areas. A concentration of female-oriented labor occurred in the production of textile, silk, and other light industries.

Response to legislation 
In 1953, the government realized that the Marriage and Land Law had received large pushback from male members of society. The economy could also no longer handle the large amount of the labor force that it had mobilized. Murder and suicide rates among women who wished to terminate their marriage also reached a new high. For the next few years, the CCP focused more on overall societal stability and emphasized more domestic values for women to support a peaceful home life.

Land reform movement 
Rural women had a significant impact on China's land reform movement, with the Communist Party making specific efforts to mobilize them for agrarian revolution. Party activists observed that because peasant women were less tied to old power structures, they more readily opposed those identified as class enemies. In 1947, Deng Yingchao emphasized at a land reform policy meeting that "women function as great mobilizers when they speak bitterness." The All-China Women's Federation issued a call to Party activists to encourage peasant women to understand their "special bitterness" from a class perspective. Women activists helped peasant women prepare to speak in public, including by roleplaying as landlords to help such women practice.

The Great Leap Forward 
The Great Leap Forward's focus on total workforce mobilization resulted in opportunities for women's labor advancement. As women became increasingly needed to work in agriculture and industry, and encouraged by policy to do so, the phenomenon of Iron Women arose. Women did traditionally male work in both fields and factories, including major movements of women into management positions. Women competed for high productivity, and those who distinguished themselves came to be called Iron Women.

Although the Great Leap Forward Movement was ultimately a disastrous failure, it paved the way for women's labor force participation during the Cultural Revolution period.

The Cultural Revolution 

The Cultural Revolution period beginning in 1966 brought prosperous economic development as women's labor force participation remained high. Further, women's representation in higher educational settings was also higher compared to previous and future time periods. However, women still suffered a lower status in Chinese culture. During this time, the All Women's Federation was also forced to suspend itself, an indication that female priorities were considered less important on the political agenda.

During the Cultural Revolution, one way China promoted its policy of state feminism was through revolutionary operas developed by Mao's wife Jiang Qing. Most of the eight model dramas in this period featured women as their main characters. The narratives of these women protagonists begin with them oppressed by misogyny, class position, and imperialism before liberating themselves through the discovery of their own internal strength and the Communist Party.

The extremely leftist Cultural Revolution Movement often ignored women's issues, and considered them no different from men without considering their lower status. Women were often depicted as strong capable warriors who fought in the name of Communism and China in propaganda posters. In many cases during the introduction of the Red Guard, women felt the need to be a leading force. This resulted in numerous women at schools being beaten and humiliated by their peers if they did not live up to Communist standards. Despite being depicted as strong and proud, unequal treatment for women was still relevant in the 1960s. Many women who completed their educational requirements were still assigned poorer jobs next to their male counterparts who would receive better quality jobs. After the elimination of the assigned work units and the ability to migrate from the countryside to urban areas became available, many girls started living outside of the traditional sense that was still practiced in the rural areas. These girls would eventually become known as the factory girls due to their work in poor conditioned factories.

Post-Mao period to the 2000s 
Following the 1970s, tremendous success was brought by the reform movements to China's economic success, however, this success did not equally impact the status of women. Unequal employment opportunities and income distribution have become such large issues that the United Nations Development Program has allocated specific funds to aid women who are laid-off from their jobs. Prostitution has also become an issue, especially in urban areas, as well as an increasing divorce rate. Women in rural areas are worse off compared to women in urban areas because of the lack of market economy present in rural cities.

On the other hand, benefits to women include increased educational opportunities such as women's studies programs and academic scholarships. The Center for Women's Studies in China was established at Zhengzhou University in 1987, along with many other women's programs and research centers.

In 1995, the Fourth United Nations Conference on Women held in Beijing marked a turning point for Chinese feminism. This time period in the aftermath of the 1989 Tiananmen Square demonstrations saw a limit in spontaneously organized activism as ordered by the Chinese government. Instead, Chinese feminists published numerous articles in mainstream media, especially in the Women's Federation newspaper Chinese Women's Daily. Chinese women's non-governmental organizations served as a crucial lever to open social spaces and allow for activism.

Present day 
Gender inequality is still an issue in China in rural areas, despite the improvement of women's rights during Mao's era. Even in the 21st century, men have more access to social resources and high socioeconomic status, due to the existing prevalence of patriarchal values in Chinese society. The gender gap is wider in rural areas, where one ninth of the population still lives. But recently under CCP's current general secretary Xi Jinping, women's position in rural areas have been improving.

Post-Mao Party leaders such as former CCP general secretary Zhao Ziyang have vigorously opposed the participation of women in the political process. Within the CCP, a glass ceiling still exists that prevents women from rising into the most important positions.

See also 
 Feminism in China
 History of the Chinese Communist Party

References

Further reading 
 Chang, Leslie. Factory Girls: From Village to City in a Changing China. Spiegel & Grau 2009
 Gittings, John. China Changes Face: The Road from Revolution, 1949-89. Oxford paperbacks 1990
 Gilmartin, Christina (2008). "Xiang Jingyu". From The Oxford Encyclopedia of Women in World History
 Li, Danke. Echoes of Chongqing: Women in Wartime China. University of Illinois Press 2009
 Mitter, Rana (2004). A Bitter Revolution. New York: Oxford University Press.
 Yang, Rae (1998). Spider Eaters: A Memoir. University of California Press.

Feminism in China
Ideology of the Chinese Communist Party
Marxist feminism
Political movements in China
Politics of China